RCGC may refer to:

 Rowan College at Gloucester County, located in Sewell, New Jersey, United States
 Royal Calcutta Golf Club, the oldest golf club in India and the first outside Great Britain
 Royal Canberra Golf Club, a golf club in Yarralumla, Australian Capital Territory